NGC 644 is a barred spiral galaxy in the constellation Phoenix in the southern sky. It is estimated to be 270 million light-years from the Milky Way and has a diameter of approximately 130,000 light-years. Together with NGC 641, it probably forms a gravitationally bound pair of galaxies. The object was discovered on September 5, 1834 by John Herschel.

See also 
 List of NGC objects (1–1000)

References

External links 
 

Barred spiral galaxies
Phoenix (constellation)
0644
006097